The Book of Skulls is a science fiction novel by American writer Robert Silverberg, first published in 1972. It was nominated for the Nebula Award in 1972, and both the Hugo and Locus Awards in 1973.

Synopsis 
The plot concerns four college students who discover a Catalan manuscript, The Book of Skulls, dealing with an order of monks living in a monastery in the Arizona desert, whose members claim the power to bestow immortality on those who complete their bizarre initiation rite. The boys travel to the monastery, where they are accepted as a "Receptacle", and told that for each group of four who agree to undergo the ritual, two must die in order for the others to succeed—one must sacrifice himself, and the other must be sacrificed at one or more of the others' hands.

The narrative switches back and forth between the viewpoints of the four students as each confronts his personal demons on the way to completing the ritual.  Ned, who is openly homosexual, must face his guilt over the tragic aftermath of one of his affairs; Eli, the gifted (but socially inept) young man who discovered the manuscript, makes a confession that could destroy his academic career; Timothy, star athlete and prodigal son of a wealthy family, confronts a terrible sin from his past involving his younger sister; and Oliver, the handsome, over-motivated farm kid from the wrong side of the tracks, comes face to face with his own true innermost nature.

The Book of Skulls has been republished as part of the series SF Masterworks.

Reception
Baird Searles found the novel well-crafted but unsatisfying, saying of the viewpoint characters that "none [were] particularly likeable, interesting, or convincing."

James Blish, despite finding the novel a "noble failure," described it as "so unobtrusively, flawlessly written that even at its most puzzling it comes as perilously close to poetic beauty as any of the contemporary novels I've ever read."

Film adaptation 
The cover of the 2006 paperback edition stated that the novel is "Soon to be made into a major motion picture."  While there has been speculation on various film-related websites, plans for production failed to materialize.

In 2003, Paramount Pictures had optioned the rights for a remake, with William Friedkin directing and Jeff Davis adapting. No further development had been made.

References

External links
  
 The Book of Skulls at Worlds Without End

1972 American novels
1972 science fiction novels
Novels by Robert Silverberg
Novels set in Arizona
Religion in science fiction